The Vietnam Veterans Memorial silver dollar is a commemorative coin issued by the United States Mint in 1994. It was one of three coins in the 1994 Veterans Program, along with the Prisoners of War and Women in Military Service for America Memorial silver dollars.

Legislation
The United States Veterans Commemorative Coin Act of 1993 authorized the production of a commemorative silver dollar to pay tribute to veterans of the Vietnam War and the Vietnam War Memorial in Washington, D.C. The act allowed the coins to be struck in both proof and uncirculated finishes. The coin was first released on July 29, 1994, the 10th anniversary of the dedication of the memorial.

Design
The obverse of the Vietnam Veterans Memorial commemorative dollar, designed by John Mercanti, features a section of the Vietnam Veterans Memorial Wall, with an outstretched hand touching a name, and the Washington Monument and a tree in the background. The reverse, designed by Thomas D. Rogers, Sr., features three medals awarded during war.

Specifications
The following specifications are given by H.R. 3616.
 Weight: 
 Diameter: 
 Composition: 90% Silver, 10% Copper

The coin has reeded edges, and is distributed in a dark green display box.

See also

 United States commemorative coins
 List of United States commemorative coins and medals (1990s)

References

1994 establishments in the United States
Modern United States commemorative coins